Gifts from the Holy Ghost is the third studio album by American rock band Dorothy, released on April 22, 2022 by Roc Nation. The album was preceded by the singles "Rest in Peace" and "Black Sheep".

Background
The album was inspired by an incident in which a member of Dorothy's staff nearly died from a drug overdose but recovered after singer Dorothy Martin prayed for his survival. Martin's recent sobriety is another influence on the album. Most of the album's lyrics are about spirituality and healing, despite its "swaggering" hard rock and classic rock sounds.

Critical reception
The album received mixed to positive reviews from the rock music press. Kerrang! praised Martin's powerful vocals, but found the album's lyrics and hard rock attitude to be somewhat limited. Reviewer Carl Fisher noted a disconnect between the lyrics about spiritual reawakening and the party-like hard rock sounds. Ghost Cult noted that the album contains few surprises, though it features a more stripped-down sound than the band's previous albums and remains an enjoyable listing experience.

Spill Magazine noted some occasional genre experiments like country rock while also praising Martin's vocals. Riff Magazine noted that the album mixes the "bombastic urgency" and "earnest classic rock" of Dorothy's previous albums, and described the album as "a triumphant battle cry and a return to form." Distorted Sound concluded that the album "has an infectious energy that will make you want to get up and dance." Cryptic Rock concluded that "Martin and her tight band of rockers have put together their most mature and well-written albums [sic] to date." The Soundboard concluded that the album cements Dorothy's status as one of the most accomplished among a recent spate of retro-rock bands.

Track listing

Personnel 
 Dorothy Martin – lead vocals
 Devon Pangle – guitar
 Eli Wulfmeier – guitar
 Eliot Lorango – bass
 Jason Ganberg – drums

References

2022 albums
Dorothy (band) albums
Roc Nation albums